Freedom is a 2010 novel by American author Jonathan Franzen. It was published by Farrar, Straus and Giroux. Freedom received general acclaim from book critics, was ranked one of the best books of 2010 by several publications, and called by some critics the "Great American Novel". In 2022, it was announced that Freedom would be adapted for television.

The novel follows the lives of the Berglund family, particularly the parents Patty and Walter, as their lives develop and then their happiness falls apart. Important to their story is a college friend of Walter's and successful rock musician, Richard Katz, who has a love affair with Patty. Walter and Patty's son, Joey, also goes through his own coming-of-age challenges.

Franzen began working on the novel in 2001, following his successful novel The Corrections. The title of the novel was an artifact of his book proposal, where he wanted to write a novel that freed him from the constraints of his previous work. The cover of many editions of the novel includes a cerulean warbler, a songbird, for which Walter works to create an environmental preserve.

Plot

Good Neighbors

The novel opens with a brief look at the Berglund family during their time living in St. Paul, Minnesota, from the perspective of their nosy neighbors. The Berglunds are portrayed as an ideal liberal and middle-class family, and they are among the first families to move into urban St. Paul after years of white flight to the suburbs. Patty Berglund is a charming and youthful homemaker with a self-deprecating sense of humor; her husband Walter is a mild-mannered but principled lawyer with environmentalist advocacies. They have one daughter, Jessica, and one son, Joey, the latter exhibiting a precocious independence and talent for making money. Joey becomes sexually involved with a neighborhood teen named Connie Monaghan and begins to rebel against his mother, going so far as to move in with Connie and her family, making Patty and Walter increasingly unstable. After many unhappy years, and after both Joey and Jessica have gone off to college, Patty and Walter relocate to Washington, D.C., abandoning the neighborhood and house they have worked so hard to improve.

Mistakes Were Made

The second section of the novel is a story-within-a-story, presented as an autobiography written by Patty at her therapist's suggestion. She recalls her youth as a star basketball player, her alienation from her busy Democrat parents and artistically-inclined siblings, and her being date-raped. Instead of attending an East Coast elite college like her siblings, she obtains a varsity scholarship to the University of Minnesota, where she continues her successful basketball career. Through her best friend at the time, a possessive and disturbed girl named Eliza, she meets an attractive indie rock musician named Richard Katz, and his nerdy but kind roommate, Walter Berglund.

Shortly after finally detaching herself from Eliza, Patty suffers a career-ending knee injury, and attempts to woo Richard on a road trip to New York. Failing to do so, she settles down with Walter, who has been patiently courting her for more than a year. Despite being happy with Walter and raising a family with him, Patty is unable to forget her physical attraction to Richard. As a result, nearly twenty years after college, she betrays Walter in a brief affair with Richard during a stay at the Berglunds' vacation house, located on an unnamed lake in Minnesota. She learns that Richard denied her advances decades earlier out of respect for his best friend Walter.

2004

The third section of the novel jumps to the early 2000s, and alternates in viewpoint among Richard, Joey, and Walter.

By 2004, a middle-aged Richard has finally found success as a minor indie rock star, with his breakthrough album Nameless Lake having been secretly inspired by his affair. Uncomfortable with commercial success, he burns through his new-found money. Walter, who has been working in Washington, D.C. for an unorthodox environmental organization called the Cerulean Mountain Trust, calls him to enlist his help for a personal project. Richard learns that the Trust is funded by a coal mining magnate who wants to strip mine a section of West Virginia territory before turning it into a preserve for the cerulean warbler, a songbird. Walter hopes to use some of the Trust's funding for his pet project, a campaign against human overpopulation. Believing that Richard's rock star reputation could greatly help the campaign, Walter meets up with him, and introduces him to Walter's beautiful young assistant, Lalitha. Richard notices that Lalitha appears to be deeply in love with Walter, and also learns from Walter that his marriage with Patty, who has been suffering from depression, is deteriorating.

After navigating many difficulties in relocating obstinate West Virginian families living on the proposed preserve territory, including convincing a body-armor manufacturer for the Iraq War, which Walter greatly opposes, to employ the displaced families, Walter and Lalitha complete the deals required to set up the future warbler preserve. After drinking for the first time in his life, Walter inadvertently declares his love for Lalitha, and they kiss, but stop short of having sex. Now able to use funding for the anti-overpopulation campaign, which they name Free Space, Walter invites Richard back to Washington D.C. While attempting to show interest in the initiative, Richard reaches out to Patty, and tries to convince her to leave Walter and let him be happy. Patty refuses, and shows Richard the autobiography she wrote as therapy ("Mistakes Were Made"), trying to convince him that she still loves Walter. After reading it, Richard deliberately leaves the manuscript on Walter's desk for him to see. Hurt and enraged, Walter throws Patty out despite her claims that her affair with Richard is done and that she loves him. Lonely and directionless, Patty goes to Jersey City to live with Richard.

Meanwhile, the Berglunds' estranged son, Joey, now studies at the University of Virginia. He initially finds his new life unsatisfactory compared to his younger years in Minnesota; he blames the September 11 attacks and its effects on the people around him. His attempts to break away from his childhood sweetheart Connie fail when he finds himself seeking their intimacy. However, after a Thanksgiving at his roommate Jonathan's family in the D.C. suburbs, Joey meets Jonathan's exceptionally beautiful but mischievous sister Jenna, and is exposed to their father's Zionist politics, which along with increased involvement with neo-conservatives, further alienate Joey from his father. Through Jonathan's father's connections, Joey meets Kenny Bartles, an entrepreneur determined to profit from the ongoing Iraq War. Kenny is subcontracted by LBI for a highly lucrative Department of Defense project, to procure supply trucks to serve in the frontlines. Kenny convinces Joey to invest a large amount up-front, only for Joey to discover that Kenny has dubiously chosen an obsolete truck model for the deal.

At home in Minnesota, Connie suffers from depression, which is worsened by Joey's distant treatment of her. Joey impulsively marries her after she gives him her savings to invest in the subcontract, although he keeps the marriage secret from everyone, especially his parents. However, Joey continues to flirt with Jenna, and during a trip to South America is given a chance to sleep with her; during the act, he unexpectedly suffers impotence, and realizes his true love for Connie. His ensuing exploits in finding truck parts in South America are disastrous, and he is pressured to ship defective parts to fulfill his contract, causing him extreme guilt, which leads him to call his father for advice. Walter is proud of Joey's show of conscience, and Joey decides not to blow the whistle, instead donating much of the proceeds from his subcontract. He also eventually tells both parents about having married Connie, who now happily lives with him.

With Patty gone, Walter and Lalitha become lovers. However, increasingly depressive after his separation from Patty, Walter loses his temper on live TV at the inauguration of the new West Virginian body-armor factory, expressing his contempt for the displaced families and the Trust's corporate backers. He and Lalitha get fired as a result, and are forced to continue the Free Space initiative without the Trust's help, though Walter's speech leads him to become an icon for radicals across the country. They plan a large concert to raise awareness, but without Richard and the Trust the event becomes an echo chamber for already-radicalized youth. While on a road trip with Walter to visit campgrounds across the nation before the concert, Lalitha leaves early to manage the increasing destructiveness of concert attendees, and is killed in a car crash.

Mistakes Were Made (Conclusion)

The penultimate section of the novel is a follow-up chapter to Patty's autobiography, written specifically for Walter. Patty reveals that she has not talked to Walter for six years. She lasted only several months living with Richard, aware of their long-term incompatibility.

For several months after her split with Richard, Patty stays with her college basketball friends, until her father was suddenly diagnosed with cancer. After traveling home to see him again in his final days, Patty visits each of her siblings to negotiate a compromise in the family's heated squabbles over the estate, and gradually redeems her relationship with her family, little though any of them agree with one another. Patty then lives alone in Brooklyn and works at a private school, where she found a passion for teaching and coaching young children. She relates that Joey has been successful in a new sustainable coffee business, while Jessica has focused on a career in publishing, and that Patty's separation from Walter has caused the siblings to become closer to each other despite their differences. Six years after she left Walter, Patty runs into Richard, who is now comfortable with his success. Richard convinces Patty to get in touch with Walter, saying she's good at telling stories, and this motivates her to write a concluding chapter to her autobiography.

Canterbridge Estates Lake

After Lalitha's death, Walter retreats to his family's lakeside house in Minnesota, where the previously unnamed lake has been renamed Canterbridge Estates Lake after a new residential development built across the water from Walter's house. His new neighbors see him as a cranky recluse, obsessed with preventing their house cats from killing birds nesting on his property. One day, Walter, who did not read the manuscript Patty sent him, finds her on the steps of the lakeside house. Despite his rage and confusion, he eventually takes her back, and they rekindle their relationship slowly, spending all of their time together. Patty quickly earns the admiration of Walter's neighbors, but after less than a year, she and Walter move out, returning to her job in New York, where most of her family and their friends also live. According to Walter's wishes, the old lakeside house is turned into a fenced, cat-proof bird sanctuary, named in memory of Lalitha.

Development
After the critical acclaim and popular success of his third novel The Corrections in 2001, Franzen began work on his fourth full-length novel. When asked during an October 30, 2002, interview on Charlie Rose how far he was into writing the new novel, Franzen replied:

I'm about a year of frustration and confusion into it ... Y'know, I'm kind of down at the bottom of the submerged iceberg peering up for the surface of the water ... I don't have doubt about my ability to write a good book, but I have lots of doubt about what it's going to look like.

Franzen went on to suggest that a basic story outline was in place, and that his writing of the new novel was like a "guerrilla war" approaching different aspects of the novel (alluding to characters, dialogue, plot development, etc.). Franzen also agreed that he would avoid public appearances, saying that "getting some work done is the vacation" from the promotional work surrounding The Corrections and How To Be Alone.

An excerpt entitled "Good Neighbors" appeared in the June 8 and 15, 2009, issues of The New Yorker. The magazine published a second extract entitled "Agreeable" in the May 31, 2010, edition.

On October 16, 2009, Franzen made an appearance alongside David Bezmozgis at the New Yorker Festival held in the Cedar Lake Theatre to read a portion of his forthcoming novel. Sam Allard, writing for North By Northwestern website covering the event, said that the "material from his new (reportedly massive) novel "was as buoyant and compelling as ever" and "marked by his familiar undercurrent of tragedy". Franzen read "an extended clip from the second chapter".

On March 12, 2010, details about the plot and content of Freedom were published in the Macmillan fall catalogue for 2010.

In an interview with Dave Haslam  on October 3, 2010, Franzen discussed why he had called the book Freedom:

The reason I slapped the word on the book proposal I sold three years ago without any clear idea of what kind of book it was going to be is that I wanted to write a book that would free me in some way. And I will say this about the abstract concept of 'freedom'; it's possible you are freer if you accept what you are and just get on with being the person you are, than if you maintain this kind of uncommitted I'm free-to-be-this, free-to-be-that, faux freedom.

Franzen has stated the writing of Freedom was deeply impacted by the death of his close friend and fellow novelist David Foster Wallace.

Reception
Freedom received general acclaim from book critics, particularly for its writing and characterization. Shortly before the book's release, Time magazine featured Franzen on its cover, describing him as a "Great American Novelist", making him the first author to appear on its cover in a decade.

Sam Tanenhaus of The New York Times and Benjamin Alsup of Esquire believed it measured up to Franzen's previous novel, The Corrections. Tanenhaus called it a "masterpiece of American fiction", writing that it "[told] an engrossing story" and "[illuminated], through the steady radiance of its author's profound moral intelligence, the world we thought we knew." Alsup called it a great American novel. In The Millions, Garth Risk Hallberg argued that readers who enjoyed The Corrections would enjoy Freedom, writing that readers are "likely to come away from this novel moved in harder-to-fathom ways—and grateful for it." An editor for Publishers Weekly wrote that it stood apart from most modern fiction because "Franzen tries to account for his often stridently unlikable characters and find where they (and we) went wrong, arriving at—incredibly—genuine hope."

Benjamin Secher of The Telegraph called Franzen one of America's best living novelists, and Freedom the first great American novel of the "post-Obama era". In The Guardian, Jonathan Jones called him "a literary genius" and wrote that Freedom stood on "a different plane from other contemporary fiction".

Michiko Kakutani called the book "galvanic" and wrote that it showcased Franzen's talent as a storyteller and "his ability to throw open a big, Updikean picture window on American middle-class life." Kakutani also praised the novel's characterization, going on to call it a "compelling biography of a dysfunctional family and an indelible portrait of our times." The Economist stated that the novel contained "fully imagined characters in a powerful narrative" and had "all its predecessor's power and none of its faults."

Not all reviews were raving. Most lukewarm reviews praised the novel's prose, but believed the author's left-wing political stance was too obvious. Sam Anderson, in a review for New York magazine, thought the characterization was strong, but perceived the politics as sometimes too heavy-handed: "Franzen the crank—mighty detester of Twitter, ATVs, and housing developments" occasionally "overpower[s] Franzen the artist ... but if crankiness is the motor that powers Franzen's art, I'm perfectly willing to sit through some speeches." Ron Charles of The Washington Post remarked that it lacked the wit and "[freshness]" of The Corrections.  Charles praised Franzen's prose and called him "an extraordinary stylist", but questioned how many readers would settle for good writing as "sufficient compensation for what is sometimes a misanthropic slog." Ruth Franklin of The New Republic believed the novel resembled a "soap opera" more than it did an epic, and that Franzen had forgotten "the greatest novels must ... offer ... profundity and pleasure."

Alexander Nazaryan criticized its familiarity in the New York Daily News remarking that the author "can write about a gentrifying family in St. Paul. Or maybe in St. Louis. But that's about it." Nazaryan also didn't believe Franzen was joking when he suggested "being doomed as a novelist never to do anything but stories of Midwestern families." Alan Cheuse of National Public Radio found the novel "[brilliant]" but not enjoyable, suggesting that "every line, every insight, seems covered with a light film of disdain. Franzen seems never to have met a normal, decent, struggling human being whom he didn't want to make us feel ever so slightly superior to. His book just has too much brightness and not enough color." In a scathing review for The Atlantic, Brian Reynolds Myers called the book "juvenile" and "directionless", and filled with "mediocrities".

Ross Douthat of First Things praised the "stretches of Freedom that read like a master class in how to write sympathetically about the kind of characters" with an abundance of freedom. Yet, Douthat concluded the novel was overlong, feeling the "impression that Franzen's talents are being wasted on his characters."

Awards and endorsements
Freedom won the John Gardner Fiction Award. Additionally, it was a finalist for the Los Angeles Times Book Prize and the National Book Critics Circle Award for Fiction. The American Library Association also named it a notable fiction of the 2010 publishing year.

Oprah Winfrey made Freedom her first book club selection of 2010, saying, "this book is a masterpiece." US President Barack Obama called it "terrific" after reading it over the summer.

Adaptation
In July 2022, it was announced that Tomorrow Studios and Scott Free Productions would adapt Freedom as a television series. The script will be written by Melanie Marnich, which Franzen said was a "perfect choice."  Franzen, Marnich, and Ridley Scott will serve as executive producers for the series.

References

Further reading

In-depth studies and reviews
Bresnan, Mark. "Consistently Original, Perennially Unheard Of: Punk, Margin and Mainstream in Jonathan Franzen's Freedom". Write in Tune: Contemporary Music in Fiction.  London: Bloomsbury (2014), 31–42.
Keith Gessen, Mark Greif, Benjamin Kunkel, Marco Roth. "Four Responses to Freedom". n + 1 10 (2010).
Gram, Margaret Hunt. "Freedom's Limits: Jonathan Franzen, the Realist Novel, and the Problem of Growth". American Literary History.  26:2 (2014), 295–316.
Irr, Caren. "Postmodernism in Reverse: American National Allegories and the 21st-Century Political Novel". Twentieth Century Literature.  57:3-4 (2011), 516–538.

External links
Publisher information from Farrar, Straus and Giroux about the novel.
Excerpts from The New Yorker
"Good Neighbors" (June 2009)
"Agreeable" (May 2010)
Presentation by Franzen on Freedom: A Novel at the Miami Book Fair International, November 21, 2010

2010 American novels
Novels by Jonathan Franzen
Family saga novels
Novels set in West Virginia
Farrar, Straus and Giroux books
Novels about dysfunctional families